The Mack B. Nelson house is a historic residence located at 5500 Ward Parkway in the Sunset Hill neighborhood of the Country Club District in Kansas City, Missouri.

History
Mack Barnabas Nelson was born in Arkansas in 1872. He came to Kansas City in 1894, where he worked for the Long-Bell Lumber Company. At the time of construction, Nelson was vice-president of the lumber company, but he later came to the top position in the company after Long suffered financial reverses early in the Great Depression. Construction took place during the same time as construction of the Bernard Corrigan House, which is located directly across 55th Street.

Architecture
Built in 1914, the house is a large  rectangle built around an interior atrium, which is lit by movable skylight.  It houses 16 bedrooms, 8 bathrooms, a swimming pool with pool house and a basketball court.

The architect was Henry F. Hoit who also designed the R. A. Long residence which is now the Kansas City Museum.

Houses in Kansas City, Missouri